Srednekolymsk (Orto Xalıma) is a town and the administrative center of Srednekolymsky District in the Sakha Republic, Russia, located on the left bank of the Kolyma River,  northeast of Yakutsk, the capital of the republic. As of the 2010 Census, its population was 3,525.

History
When the Russians arrived in the 1640s, they built three forts on the Kolyma: Nizhnekolymsk, Srednekolymsk, and Verkhnekolymsk (i.e., lower, middle, and upper Kolymsk). They were about three days sled journey apart. Nizhnekolymsk was on the delta near the route to Anadyrsk. Srednekolymsk was at the head of navigation by seagoing koches, in forested country for good fur trapping and on the overland route to the Indigirka River. Verkhnekolymsk was smaller and upriver. The first fort (ostrog) was founded in 1644 by Mikhail Stadukhin. Some say that this was Nizhnekolymsk, but Fisher thinks that the original fort was Srednekolymsk and that the main Russian center was moved to Nizhnekolymsk by 1655 when the Anadyrsk route became important.

At some point the name was changed to Yarmanka, from the Russian word for "fair", referring to the annual gatherings of indigenous inhabitants of the area here in spring. The settlement grew over the next century, and was granted town status and its present name in 1775. In Imperial times, it was a destination for political exiles.

Administrative and municipal status
Within the framework of administrative divisions, Srendekolymsk serves as the administrative center of Srednekolymsky District. As an inhabited locality, Srednekolymsk is classified as a town under district jurisdiction. As an administrative division, it is, together with one rural locality (the selo of Lobuya), incorporated within Srednekolymsky District as the Town of Srednekolymsk. As a municipal division, the Town of Srednekolymsk is incorporated within Srednekolymsky Municipal District as Srednekolymsk Urban Settlement.

Economy and infrastructure
The town is largely reliant on farming of reindeer, hunting for pelts, and fishing.

Transportation
The town is served by the Srednekolymsk Airport . In the summer, river transport takes place, and in the winter, land transport can be performed on the ice.

Climate
Srednekolymsk has a dry and very cold subarctic climate (Köppen climate classification Dfc), bordering on an extreme subarctic climate (Köppen climate classification Dfd), featuring with mild, sometimes hot, even very hot, but short summers and extremely brutal winters with almost no snowfall. The winter lasts from October until May and temperatures rise rapidly enough for Siberian larch trees to be able to grow during the fleeting summer, before falling rapidly again in August and September. Temperatures often do not exceed  between late September and early May.

The midnight sun is above the horizon from 30 May to 13 July, the polar night last from 19 December to 24 December (6 days).

References

Notes

Sources
Official website of the Sakha Republic. Registry of the Administrative-Territorial Divisions of the Sakha Republic. Srednekolymsky District. 

Cities and towns in the Sakha Republic
Populated places of Arctic Russia
Populated places established in 1644
Kolyma basin